Orsidis privatus is a species of beetle in the family Cerambycidae. It was described by Francis Polkinghorne Pascoe in 1866. It is known from Malaysia.

References

Lamiini
Beetles described in 1866